Museum of Russian Icons may refer to:
Museum of Russian Icons (Clinton, Massachusetts)
Museum of Russian Icons, Moscow